Delvar District is in Tangestan County, Bushehr province, Iran. At the 2006 census, its population was 28,017 in 6,486 households. The following census in 2011 counted 32,154 people in 8,319 households. At the latest census in 2016, the district had 36,481 inhabitants living in 10,473 households.

References 

Districts of Bushehr Province
Populated places in Tangestan County